The 1931 Loyola Wolf Pack football team was an American football team that represented Loyola College of New Orleans (now known as Loyola University New Orleans) as a member of the Southern Intercollegiate Athletic Association (SIAA) during the 1931 college football season. In its fifth season under head coach Clark Shaughnessy, the team compiled a 5–4 record and outscored opponents by a total of 154 to 91. The team played its home games at Loyola University Stadium in New Orleans.

Schedule

References

Loyola
Loyola Wolf Pack football seasons
Loyola Wolf Pack football